Icarus is the third studio album by the alternative metal band Chicosci. It was released in 2004 on Viva Music.

Track listing

Credits 
Executive producer: Vic del Rosario Jr.
Associate producer: Vincent del Rosario
Co-produced by Miguel Alcaraz
Album cover and design by Cairo Visual
Mixed and mastered by Angee Rozul at Tracks Studios

Music videos from singles

Reference 

2004 albums
Chicosci albums